The 2022 Reese's 200 was the eleventh stock car race of the 2022 ARCA Menards Series season, the sixth race of the 2022 Sioux Chief Showdown, and the 14th iteration of the event. The race was held on Friday, July 29, 2022, in Brownsburg, Indiana at Lucas Oil Indianapolis Raceway Park, a 0.686 mile (1.104 km) permanent oval-shaped racetrack. The race took the scheduled 200 laps to complete. Chandler Smith, driving for Venturini Motorsports, dominated most of the race, and earned his 10th career ARCA Menards Series win, along with his first of the season. Sammy Smith also dominated a portion of the race, leading 89 laps. To fill out the podium, Smith, driving for Kyle Busch Motorsports, and Taylor Gray, driving for David Gilliland Racing, would finish 2nd and 3rd, respectively.

Background 
It includes a  oval track, a  road course (which has fallen into disrepair and is no longer used), and a  drag strip which is among the premier drag racing venues in the world. The complex receives about 500,000 visitors annually.

Entry list 

 (R) denotes rookie driver

Practice 
The only 45-minute practice session is scheduled to be held on Friday, July 29, at 12:30 PM EST.

Qualifying 
Qualifying was held on Friday, July 29, at 2:15 PM EST. The qualifying system used is a single-car, two-lap system with only one round. Whoever sets the fastest time in the round wins the pole.

Race results

Standings after the race 

Drivers' Championship standings

Note: Only the first 10 positions are included for the driver standings.

References

External links 

2022 ARCA Menards Series
NASCAR races at Lucas Oil Raceway at Indianapolis
Reese's 200
2022 in sports in Indiana